Bait and Switch is the debut album by Columbus, Ohio-based rock band Thomas Jefferson Slave Apartments. It was released on July 11, 1995 on American Recordings' imprint Onion Records. It was recorded at a cost of $800.

Critical reception 

In a contemporary review for the Chicago Tribune, Greg Kot gave Bait and Switch 3 out of 4 stars, writing, "Nothing new here, just a clangorous, nasty good time courtesy of some saw-toothed riffs and a supremely estranged wit." David Sprague wrote in Trouser Press that the album's highlight was "...the revolutionary screed "RnR Hall of Fame," which tosses verbal firebombs at the very concept of the Cleveland rock hall, advocating that someone "blow it up...before Paul Westerberg gets in." Robert Christgau gave the album an A− grade and wrote that on it, the band's frontman Ron House demonstrates "that punk and youth need have nothing to do with each other anymore." Entertainment Weeklys Ethan Smith gave the album a B+ grade, calling it "short on polish, long on charm." In a 2009 retrospective review, Magnet called the album "razor-sharp-yet-unrefined" and "an incendiary near-masterpiece".

Track listing 
	My Mysterious Death (Turn It Up) –	4:00
	Is She Shy –	2:43
	Down To High Street –	3:42
	Quarrel With The World –	3:11
	Cheater's Heaven –	3:47
	Cyclotron –	2:05
	Negative Guest List –	2:41
	Fire In The Swimming Girl –	3:47
	You Can't Kill Stupid –	2:53
	RnR Hall Of Fame –	1:06
	Contract Dispute –	4:32
	Wrongheaded –	2:32

Personnel 
Keith Baker –	Composer
Craig Dunson –	Engineer
Craig "Big Dad" Dunson –	Bass
Steve Evans –	Engineer
Ted Hattemer –	Drums
Ron House –	Vocals
John Morton –	Composer
Bob Petric –	Guitar, Vocals (Background)

References 

1995 debut albums
American Recordings (record label) albums